"It's Too Late to Love Me Now" is a song written by Gene Dobbins, Rory Bourke, and Johnny Wilson. Since its composition, the song has been covered as a single by various artists from the country and pop musical genres. It was first released as a single by country artist, Charly McClain in 1977.

"It's Too Late to Love Me Now" has also been featured on albums by various country recording artists, beginning with Dolly Parton on her 1978 release, Heartbreaker. "It's Too Late" has also been featured on albums by Lorrie Morgan, Loretta Lynn, and Dottie West.

Charly McClain version 
"It's Too Late" was first released as a single by American country artist, Charly McClain. Released in April 1977, the song peaked at number eighty seven on the Billboard Magazine Hot Country Singles chart. It was the third and final single from McClain's debut album, Here's Charly McClain.

The song was the first of many singles McClain would release. It would also be the first of a series of recordings McClain would make for the Epic record label in Nashville, Tennessee. She would go on to have a series of major country hits in the 1980s, including "Who's Cheatin' Who" and "Radio Heart".

Chart performance

Cher version 

In 1979, American pop artist Cher released a cover version of the song and retitled it as "It's too Late (to Love Me Now)". It was issued as the third single from her fifteenth album Take Me Home in 1979. The song was originally released as a seven- and twelve-inch single respectfully in an LP format. To date, the song is Cher's only major release to country radio.

"It's Too Late (to Love Me Now)" record was a minor hit on the Billboard Hot Country Singles chart, peaking at number eighty seven. This was the same peaking chart position that McClain had with her original 1977 version of the song. The song would be one of Cher's last single releases of the decade.

Chart performance

Jeanne Pruett version 

In 1980, American country artist Jeanne Pruett released a cover version of the song and titled it as, "It's Too Late". Issued as a single in June 1980, "It's Too Late" peaked at number nine on the Billboard Hot Country Singles chart. Initially not released onto an album, a live version of "It's Too Late" was eventually issued on Pruett's 1983 effort entitled, Music Row.

The song became Pruett's third top ten single in a row on the Billboard country chart. Additionally, "It's Too Late" would become Pruett's final top ten single (and final major hit) on any Billboard singles chart. To date, Pruett's cover of the song is the most successful version.

Chart performance

References 

1977 singles
1979 singles
Charly McClain songs
Cher songs
Dolly Parton songs
Jeanne Pruett songs
Casablanca Records singles
Songs written by Rory Bourke
Epic Records singles
1977 songs
Songs written by Gene Dobbins
Songs written by Johnny Wilson (songwriter)